Exeter railway station is a heritage-listed railway station on the Main South line in New South Wales, Australia. It serves the village of Exeter. It was added to the New South Wales State Heritage Register on 2 April 1999.

History

It opened in 1878 as Badgerys Siding, and was renamed to Exeter on 12 August 1890.

Platforms and services
Exeter has two side platforms. It is serviced by early morning and evening NSW TrainLink Southern Highlands Line services travelling between Sydney Central, Campbelltown, Moss Vale and Goulburn.

During the day the station is served by NSW TrainLink road coach services from Bundanoon to Wollongong and Moss Vale to Goulburn.

Description 

The historic Exeter station complex includes a timber station building with a skillion roof (1891), a timber waiting shed on platform 2 (1891), and an additional timber station building dating from 1915, with brick-faced platforms. It also includes the two storey gabled single box on platform 2 dating from  1897, the corrugated iron lamp room, signals, platform plantings and platform signs.

Heritage listing 
Exeter is one of the best small station complexes in the State and demonstrates all of the elements of a turn of the century rural station group. In particular it has a rare on-station two level signal box (another is located at Katoomba railway station) and excellent planting on and around the station. The combination of station buildings dating from both periods of construction, signal box, signals and station details contributes to the high significance of the site. This is one of the best small country examples of station planting which was an important part of most station complexes.

The location of the group within the small and historic village of Exeter adds to both the importance of the site and the quality of the town. The site has a strong visual impact on the town and streetscape.

Exeter railway station was listed on the New South Wales State Heritage Register on 2 April 1999.

References

Attribution

External links

Exeter station details Transport for New South Wales

Railway stations in Australia opened in 1878
Regional railway stations in New South Wales
Short-platform railway stations in New South Wales, 2 cars
New South Wales State Heritage Register
Wingecarribee Shire
Main Southern railway line, New South Wales